Jermaine Jenkins (born November 20, 1984) is an American tennis coach for players such as Naomi Osaka, having previously been one of Venus Williams hitting partners. He played collegiately for Clemson University and is the brother of Jarmere Jenkins.

References 

Clemson University alumni
African-American male tennis players
African-American tennis coaches
1984 births
Living people
21st-century African-American people